Baiyu may refer to:

Baiyu (singer), singer-songwriter and actress
Palyul (Baiyu County, 白玉县), Garzê Prefecture, Sichuan, China
Baiyu River, or Yurungkash River, river in the south of Xinjiang, China
Baiyu (百育镇), town in Guangxi, China
Baiyu (Jigzhi) (白玉乡), township in Jigzhi County, Qinghai, China
Baiyu (grape), or Rkatsiteli, kind of grape used to produce white wine